Moeller High School, known as Moeller, is a private, all-male, college-preparatory high school in the suburbs of Cincinnati, in Hamilton County, Ohio. It is currently one of four all-male Catholic high schools in the Cincinnati area.

History 
Archbishop Moeller High School was established in Fall 1958 when Archbishop Karl J. Alter appointed Monsignor Edward A. McCarthy and Brother Paul Sibbing, S.M., to supervise the planning and construction of a new high school near Montgomery, Ohio. Funds for the school were provided by Catholic parishioners in the Cincinnati area as part of the Archbishop's High School Fund Campaign. Archbishop Alter named the school Archbishop Moeller High School to commemorate the fourth Archbishop of Cincinnati, Henry K. Moeller.

Moeller High School opened its doors in September 1960, along with La Salle High School, a fellow Cincinnati Archdiocesan school. Marianist Brother Lawrence Eveslage, S.M., was appointed the first principal, and the faculty consisted of Marianist priests and brothers as well as laity. Moeller High School's first class graduated in 1964. Since then, over 6,000 graduates have become Moeller High School alumni.

When it opened its doors in 1960, Moeller High School received students from over 15 parishes in the northeastern part of the Greater Cincinnati area, drawing from Roger Bacon High School and Purcell Marian High School, two other all-male comprehensive Cincinnati Archdiocesan schools. Moeller High School now accepts students from beyond its traditional boundaries, using a three-tiered system of enrollment.

Academics

Laptop program 
Starting with the freshman class of 1999, Moeller High School adopted a new laptop program. All freshmen are required to lease laptops through the program to assist in education. Leasing costs are included as part of school tuition. The laptops are equipped to use the new network installed in the school, and teachers are encouraged to use the laptops to do more in the classroom. Common uses for the laptops include writing papers, doing research (using both the Internet and the school's reference systems), and presenting projects. Many textbooks have been replaced by electronic versions. Starting with the class of 2012, students began leasing Tablet PCs rather than standard laptops, allowing them to take notes within OneNote without needing to type.

Art program 
The Moeller art program is a nationally recognized four-year program which culminates in Advanced Placement Studio Art and Art History. The program is led by department chair Jacquelyn Sommer, The program is based on extensive use of the sketchbook, as well as drawing from direct observation, as opposed to copying photographs. Each year the graduating class earns 1–3 million dollars in scholarship offers from top Visual Arts, Architecture, and Design universities.

School publications

The Crusaders  
It features eight-to-twelve pages, two of which have full color, and a variety of content, including news, features, sports, and cultural information. The Journalism I and Journalism II classes are primarily responsible for reporting, writing, and designing the paper. Students outside of these classes are also encouraged to submit story ideas and content. All content is approved by the school's administration before it is published. In 2009, The Crusader moved from a quarterly to a monthly publication.

In 2008, The Crusader won First Place, the second-highest honor a high school newspaper can receive from the American Scholastic Press Association. The contest judged The Crusader on writing, layout, and visual quality.

The Squire 
The Squire is a student literary journal that features stories, poems, and essays written by Moeller students. It is printed annually, and all students may submit to The Squire at any time. The magazine also features student artwork. Selected works for publication are chosen by Moeller's Creative Writing Club, who also edit and publish the journal each year.

Athletics 
During the 1970s and 1980s, the football team won five national titles and many other championships. Moeller's success under football head coach Gerry Faust led in part to an Ohio High School Athletic Association rule prohibiting out-of-state students from competing in sanctioned games (see Alerding v. Ohio High School Athletic Association). The football team  again reached success by winning back to back Ohio State Championships in 2012 and 2013.

The baseball team produced Major League Baseball players Barry Larkin, Ken Griffey Jr., and Adam Hyzdu. The Crusaders to Division I state baseball championships in 2009, 2012, 2013 and 2015.  Since 1992, the Moeller basketball team has won/shared 9 conference titles. Since 1999 Moeller Basketball has won 3 State Titles while going to 4 State Final Fours. In 2004, led by 5 starters who would go on to play NCAA Division I basketball, Moeller reached as high as the top 10 in USA Today's national poll. Since 2000, the Moeller Basketball Program has sent more than a dozen players on to play NCAA Division I Basketball. 

The lacrosse team has won three state titles and have been a constant force in the state and midwest. The team appeared in 5 consecutive state finals from 1989-1993 and finished as State Champions in 1992 & 1993 and were State Runner-Up in 1989, 1990 and 1991. The Crusaders returned to the State Finals in 2017 and capped off the season with a 10-game winning streak by defeating Cleveland St. Ignatius, 9-8 in double overtime to capture the programs first State Championship in 24 years and the first ever sanctioned OHSAA Division I Lacrosse State Championship.

Moeller High School's athletic teams – with the exception of boxing, skiing, and volleyball – are sanctioned by the Ohio High School Athletic Association (OHSAA) and compete in the Greater Catholic League South, along with Elder, St. Xavier and La Salle High Schools. The Greater Catholic League, more commonly known as the GCL, is often considered one of the premier high school conferences in the country.

Recently, Moeller unveiled plans to build a multipurpose stadium on campus (named Gerry Faust Athletic Complex with an 8-foot bronze statue honoring him at the entrance); however, the plan faced strong criticism from neighboring homeowners, and Moeller's request to change the zoning regulation was denied. Moeller has appealed. As of March 2008, the football field portion is fully completed and ready for immediate use. Moeller's football team has formerly played home games at Galbreath Field in Kings Mills and the University of Cincinnati's Nippert Stadium before moving to Lockland Stadium in 2009. Moeller High School's gymnasium, featuring two JumboTron screens, was named one of the top places for high school basketball by USA Today.

OHSAA team championships
 Football – 1975, 1976, 1977, 1979, 1980, 1982, 1985, 2012, 2013
 Baseball – 1972, 1989, 1993, 2004, 2009, 2012, 2013, 2015
 Basketball – 1999, 2003, 2007, 2018, 2019
Golf – 2014 
Lacrosse – 2017

Non-OHSAA championships

 Lacrosse – 1992, 1993, (Ohio High School Lacrosse Association)
 Volleyball – 1997, 1998, 2004, 2005, 2007, 2009, 2012, 2018,  2021, 2022 (Ohio High School Boys Volleyball Association)
 Rugby – 2010
 Ultimate Frisbee  – 2018

The 2007 title went to the second team in Ohio high school boys' volleyball history to go undefeated.

Lacrosse became a sanctioned OHSAA sport beginning with the 2016-17 academic year.

Volleyball will become a sanctioned OHSAA sport beginning in the 2022-2023 
academic year.

Notable alumni

Media 
 Paul Keels – play-by-play announcer for Ohio State University football and basketball on WBNS-FM

Politics 
 John Boehner – U.S. Congressman for Ohio's 8th congressional district and 61st Speaker of the United States House of Representatives
 Frank Brogan – Lieutenant Governor of Florida.
 Tom Raga – Ohio State Representative, former Republican candidate for Lieutenant Governor of Ohio
 Bob Schaffer – U.S. Congressman for Colorado's 4th congressional district, Colorado State Senator 1987-1996, Chairman of the Colorado State Board of Education.
 Joe Uecker – Ohio State Senator (R–66)

Sports

Baseball 
 Buddy Bell – former third baseman and manager
 David Bell – son of Buddy Bell; former professional baseball player; manager of the Cincinnati Reds
 Mike Bell – son of Buddy Bell and brother of David Bell; former third baseman for the Cincinnati Reds
 Andrew Brackman – former professional baseball player
 Ken Griffey Jr. – former outfielder/designated hitter for the Seattle Mariners, Cincinnati Reds and Chicago White Sox and National Baseball Hall of Fame member
 Adam Hyzdu – professional baseball player
 Barry Larkin – former shortstop for the Cincinnati Reds and National Baseball Hall of Fame member
 Stephen Larkin – brother of Barry Larkin; former 1st baseman for the Cincinnati Reds
 Bill Long – professional baseball player
 Len Matuszek – major league outfielder and first baseman
 Eric Surkamp – professional baseball player
 Brent Suter – professional baseball player for the Milwaukee Brewers
 Alex Wimmers – professional baseball player for the Miami Marlins
 Phil Diehl – professional baseball player for the Cincinnati Reds
 Zach Logue – professional baseball player for the Oakland Athletics

Basketball 
 Josh Duncan – college and international professional basketball player, Xavier University
 Byron Larkin – college basketball player, Xavier University's all-time leading scorer
 Quinn McDowell – college and pro basketball player, College of William & Mary
 Mike Sylvester – college and pro basketball player, University of Dayton
Jaxson Hayes - college and pro basketball player, 2019 first round NBA Draft lottery pick (#8), Texas Longhorns men's basketball
Miles McBride - college and pro basketball player, 2020 second round NBA Draft pick (#36), West Virginia Mountaineers men's basketball

Football 
 Doug Williams – Lexington All-American and professional football NFL Houston Oilers offensive tackle
 Steve Sylvester. University of Notre Dame, Oakland Raiders Offensive Lineman, 3 Super Bowl Rings
 Bob Crable (1978) – Notre Dame All-American and professional football linebacker and National Football Foundation College Football Hall of Fame Class of 2017
 Russ Huesman – head college football coach for the Richmond Spiders
 Greg Jones – linebacker, Tennessee Titans; All-American at Michigan State; Super Bowl XLVI champion
 Mark Kamphaus – Arena Football League quarterback, Albany Firebirds
 Michael Muñoz – college football offensive lineman; son of Anthony Muñoz
 Rob Murphy – 2 time All-American offensive lineman at The Ohio State University, 6 years in the NFL, 6 years in the CFL
 Matt Tennant – 2010 5th-round pick of the New Orleans Saints out of Boston College
 Tom Waddle – professional football player for the Chicago Bears. Radio personality on ESPN 1000 AM in Chicago
 Greg Hudson – NCAA Football coach - Notre Dame, Purdue, Florida State, East Carolina, Minnesota, Cincinnati, Connecticut.
 Rico Murray – Undrafted free agent signee by the Cincinnati Bengals.
 Tony Hunter – professional football player for Buffalo Bills and Los Angeles Rams. 12th pick in first round of 1983 NFL draft. Varsity captain in football, track, and basketball.
 Greg Huntington –  American football player
 Steve Apke – American football player
 Sam Hubbard – American football player for the Cincinnati Bengals
David Lippincott – American Football Coach for the Oakland Raiders
 Steve Niehaus – was a defensive lineman in the NFL. He was the first ever draft pick for the Seattle Seahawks and the second player taken in the 1976 NFL Draft.

Other 
Brent Brisben - Treasure Hunter – Co-founder of 1715 Fleet - Queens Jewels, LLC
Jack Norris – President and co-founder of Vegan Outreach

Notable faculty and staff 
 Bob Crable (2000–2007) –  Notre Dame All-American and professional football linebacker; later head coach and religion teacher at Moeller
 Gerry Faust –  head football coach at Moeller; later head coach at the University of Notre Dame and University of Akron
 Geoffrey Girard – fiction writer; and is the current department head and a classroom teacher of English at Moeller
 Tim Rose (1964–1966) –  assistant coach at Moeller; later head football coach at Miami University

References

External links 
 
 "Moeller Basketball Gym"

Roman Catholic Archdiocese of Cincinnati
Catholic secondary schools in Ohio
High schools in Hamilton County, Ohio
Private schools in Cincinnati
Boys' schools in Ohio
Educational institutions established in 1958
1958 establishments in Ohio
Marianist schools